Stepan Alexandrovich Gedeonov (13 June 1816, Saint Petersburg, Imperial Russia — 17 September 1878, Saint Petersburg, Imperial Russia) was a Russian art scholar, playwright, critic and historian, the director of the Hermitage Museum (in 1863-1878) and  Russian Imperial Theatres, in 1867—1875.

In 1863 Gedeonov was elected the honourable member of the Saint Petersburg Academy of Sciences. 
As a historian, he is best known for his 1876 anti-Normanist 2-volume magnum opus Varangians and Rus (Варяги и Русь) which won him the Uvarov Prize of that year.

Reportedly not keen on the Russian drama, Gedeonov (as the head of the Imperial Theatres) did little to foster its development. He strongly supported, though, Italian opera and was instrumental in getting several prominent Italian singers to perform in the Russian capital.

Gedeonov had at least one musical project of his own, Mlada, originally envisioned as a ballet to be composed by Alexander Serov. After the latter's death, the idea was revised in 1872 as a 4-act opera-ballet, with a libretto by Viktor Krylov. The composition of the score was divided between César Cui, Modest Mussorgsky, Nikolai Rimsky-Korsakov and Alexander Borodin. The project was never completed, Ludwig Minkus came up with a ballet of the same name which was produced by Marius Petipa in Saint Petersburg in 1879. Later Rimsky-Korsakov revived the original idea and wrote his own ballet-opera Mlada, premiered in 1892.

Vasilisa Melentyeva, the play that Gedeonov wrote later in his life, suffered a  somewhat similar fate. Dissatisfied with his own effort, he passed the text to Alexander Ostrovsky, and the latter used the  plot to write the completely new play of the same title.

Gedeonov authored one original play, The Death of Lyapunov (Смерть Ляпунова,  1845) which was produced by Alexandrinsky Theatre and had considerable success, running for 18 performances in its first season. Later, as the director of the Imperial Theatres, Gedeonov refused to give the permission for it to be produced, describing it as his 'childish fallacy'.

References 

Dramatists and playwrights from the Russian Empire
Russian art critics
19th-century historians from the Russian Empire
Directors of museums in Russia
Honorary members of the Saint Petersburg Academy of Sciences
Writers from Saint Petersburg
1816 births
1878 deaths
Burials at Lazarevskoe Cemetery (Saint Petersburg)